Poster House is the first museum in the United States dedicated exclusively to posters. The museum is located in Chelsea, New York City, on 23rd Street between Sixth Avenue and Seventh Avenue. The museum opened to the public on June 20, 2019.

Building and Collection
Val Crosswhite organized supporters and founded Poster House in 2015 to recognize the art and social impact of posters overlooked by existing institutions. LTL Architects and Lumen Architecture transformed the former space of Apple specialist business TekServe for museum-quality use, especially in creating its new centralized lighting system.

SVA Subway Series
On June 19, 2019 SVA announced the donation of 98 of their Subway Series posters from 1996 to the present which also includes "each newly created poster." The gift includes works by Milton Glaser, Louise Fili, Paula Scher and the creator of the current SVA Subway Poster: Jonathon Rosen.

References

External links

 

Museums in Manhattan
Chelsea, Manhattan
Museums established in 2015
Art museums and galleries in New York City
Poster museums